Annabel Dream Reader is the debut studio album by English rock band The Wytches. It was released on 25 August 2014 through Heavenly Recordings. Recording sessions took place over two days at Toe Rag Studios in Hackney, London. Production was handled by Bill Ryder-Jones and member Kristian Bell. The album was met with generally favorable reviews from music critics. It peaked at number 50 on the UK Albums Chart.

Track listing

Charts

References

External links

2014 debut albums